Casaretto is a surname. Notable people with the surname include:

 Caroline Casaretto (born 1978), German field hockey player
  (1810–1879), Italian botanist and explorer
 Marcelo Casaretto (born 1967), Argentine politician
 Pietro Casaretto (1810–1878), Italian Benedictine monk